Lijiang Sanyi International Airport  is an airport serving Lijiang, Yunnan province, China.

Facilities
The airport has one runway numbered 02/20,  in length with  turning bases at both ends of the runway.

Airlines and destinations

See also
 List of airports in the People's Republic of China

References

External links

  Official website
 Yunnan Airport Group Co., Ltd.
 
 

Airports in Yunnan
Airports established in 1995
1995 establishments in China
Transport in Lijiang